David Stucke (born April 9, 1974 in Erie, Pennsylvania) is a physics professor and poker player.

He graduated from Carnegie Mellon University, and received advanced degrees from Iowa State University and Pennsylvania State University. He lives in Henderson, Nevada.

In 2007, he won a World Series of Poker bracelet in a $1,500 No-Limit Hold’em event in the first WSOP tournament he ever entered.

He first gained media attention as a friend and stylist of Paris Hilton, but received wider notice after his sex tape, shot in 2003, was released in 2007.

As of 2008, David Stucke has tournament winnings of over $649,000.

World Series of Poker bracelets

References

Living people
American poker players
World Series of Poker bracelet winners
People from Erie, Pennsylvania
People from Henderson, Nevada
1974 births
Carnegie Mellon University alumni
Iowa State University alumni
Pennsylvania State University alumni